Horst Karsten (born 1 January 1936) is a German equestrian and Olympic medalist. He was born in Elsfleth, Lower Saxony. He competed in eventing at the 1964 Summer Olympics in Tokyo, at the 1968 Summer Olympics in Mexico City, and at the 1972 Summer Olympics in Munich.

References

External links
 

1936 births
Living people
German male equestrians
Olympic equestrians of the United Team of Germany
Olympic equestrians of West Germany
Olympic bronze medalists for the United Team of Germany
Olympic bronze medalists for West Germany
Equestrians at the 1964 Summer Olympics
Equestrians at the 1968 Summer Olympics
Equestrians at the 1972 Summer Olympics
Sportspeople from Lower Saxony
Olympic medalists in equestrian
Medalists at the 1972 Summer Olympics
Medalists at the 1964 Summer Olympics
People from Wesermarsch